Amro Hassan (born 17 February 1968) is an Egyptian diver. He competed in the men's 10 metre platform event at the 1984 Summer Olympics.

References

1968 births
Living people
Egyptian male divers
Olympic divers of Egypt
Divers at the 1984 Summer Olympics
Place of birth missing (living people)
20th-century Egyptian people
21st-century Egyptian people